Charlotte is the largest city in the U.S. state of North Carolina.

Charlotte may also refer to:
Charlotte (given name), a feminine form of the male given name Charles
Charlotte (cake), a type of dessert

Places

Australia
Charlotte, Northern Territory, a locality

Canada
Charlotte (1785–1974 electoral district), in New Brunswick
Charlotte (provincial electoral district), for the Legislative Assembly of New Brunswick from 1994 to 2006
Charlotte-The Isles, a provincial electoral district for the Legislative Assembly of New Brunswick
Charlotte-Campobello, a provincial electoral district for the Legislative Assembly of New Brunswick
Charlotte (electoral district), a federal electoral district renamed New Brunswick Southwest

Saint Vincent and the Grenadines
Charlotte Parish, Saint Vincent and the Grenadines

United States
Charlotte, Illinois
Charlotte, Iowa
Charlotte, Maine
Charlotte, Michigan
Charlotte, New York, a town in Chautauqua County
Charlotte, Rochester, New York, a neighborhood
Charlotte, North Carolina
Charlotte, Tennessee
Charlotte, Texas
Charlotte, Vermont

Music
Charlotte (singer), British singer-songwriter, composer, arranger, and record producer
Charlotte (American band), a hard rock band
Charlotte (Japanese band), a pop punk band
Charlotte (album), a 1999 album by Charlotte Nilsson

Songs
"Charlotte", a 2008 song by Booka Shade
"Charlotte" (Air Traffic song) (2007)
"Charlotte" (Kittie song) (2000)
"Charlotte", a 1969 song by Jimmy McGriff from A Thing to Come By
"Charlotte", a 1982 song by Wendy Wu

Film and television
Charlotte (1974 film), a French crime thriller
Charlotte (1981 film), a Dutch film by Frans Weisz
Charlotte (2021 film), an animated drama film
Charlotte (anime), an anime television series

Ships
Charlotte (1784 ship), a First Fleet convict transport ship to Australia
Charlotte (1803 ship), a merchant ship
Charlotte (sloop), a ship sunk off the New South Wales coast in 1808
Charlotte (sternwheeler), a paddle steamer from the Fraser River
HMS Charlotte (1798), an eight-gun schooner of the Royal Navy

Other uses
Charlotte (figure skating), a spiral move
Charlotte (horse), a British Thoroughbred racehorse
Charlotte 49ers, the athletic program of UNC-Charlotte
Charlotte, the statuette awarded for the Women's Prize for Non-Fiction

See also
Charlotte Amalie, U.S. Virgin Islands
Charlotte Amalie West, U.S. Virgin Islands
Charlotte County (disambiguation), four counties in the United States and Canada with the name
Charlotte High School (disambiguation), a list of high schools named Charlotte
Charlottesville (disambiguation)
Charlottetown (disambiguation)
Charlotteville (disambiguation)
HMS Charlotte, a list of ships of the Royal Navy
List of Age of Sail ships named Charlotte
Port Charlotte (disambiguation)
Queen Charlotte (disambiguation)
University of North Carolina at Charlotte